Mrzli Vrh is a small dispersed settlement in the hills west of Žiri in the Upper Carniola region of Slovenia.

It is a continuation of the settlement of Mrzli Vrh in the neighbouring Municipality of Idrija.

References

External links
Mrzli Vrh on Geopedia

Populated places in the Municipality of Žiri